Ishmael Wadi (born 19 December 1992) is a Zimbabwean footballer who plays as a forward for JDR Stars and the Zimbabwe national team. He was named in Zimbabwe's squad for the 2021 Africa Cup of Nations.

References

External links

1992 births
Living people
Zimbabwean footballers
Zimbabwe international footballers
Association football forwards
Bulawayo City F.C. players
F.C. Platinum players
Harare City F.C. players
CAPS United players
JDR Stars F.C. players
Zimbabwe Premier Soccer League players
National First Division players
Zimbabwean expatriate footballers
Zimbabwean expatriate sportspeople in South Africa
Expatriate soccer players in South Africa
2021 Africa Cup of Nations players